The 1998–99 All-Ireland Senior Club Hurling Championship was the 29th staging of the All-Ireland Senior Club Hurling Championship, the Gaelic Athletic Association's premier inter-county club hurling tournament. The championship began on 11 October 1998 and ended on 17 March 1999.

Birr were the defending champions, however, they were defeated in the county championship and failed to qualify.

On 17 March 1999, St. Joseph's Doora-Barefield won the championship following a 2-14 to 0-8 defeat of Rathnure in the All-Ireland final at Croke Park. It remains their only championship title.

Rathnure's Paul Codd was the championship's top scorer with 1-24.

Results

Connacht Senior Club Hurling Championship

First round

Quarter-final

Semi-final

Final

Leinster Senior Club Hurling Championship

First round

Quarter-finals

Semi-final

Final

Munster Senior Club Hurling Championship

Quarter-final

Semi-final

Final

Ulster Senior Club Hurling Championship

Semi-final

Final

All-Ireland Senior Club Hurling Championship

Quarter-final

Semi-final

Final

Championship statistics

Top scorers

Top scorers overall

Top scorers in a single game

Miscellaneous

 Ballycastle McQuillan's represented Antrim in the Ulster Championship due to Dunloy's one-year ban from the competition.

References

1998 in hurling
1999 in hurling
All-Ireland Senior Club Hurling Championship